State Route 65 (SR 65) is a  state highway located entirely in the southwestern part of Mitchell County in the southwestern part of the U.S. state of Georgia. It connects the Hopeful and Pelham areas of the state.

Route description 
SR 65 begins at an intersection with SR 311, west of Hopeful. It heads southeast and curves to the east toward Pelham. The route has an intersection with SR 97 in Hopeful. The highway travels east-southeast through rural portions of the county and passes through the town of Branchville. It has an intersection with SR 112 before reaching Pelham. Once in Pelham, the route gradually bends to the east-southeast, until it meets its eastern terminus, an intersection with SR 93.

Major intersections

See also

References

External links

 Georgia Roads (Routes 61 - 80)

065
Transportation in Mitchell County, Georgia